Zandokht Shirazi/ Zanddokht Shirazi (1909 – 1953), was a prominent Iranian feminist, poet, school teacher and women's rights activist.

Biography
Her birthname was Fakhrolmoluk and she was born into one of Shiraz's aristocratic families. She established Majma' e Enghelabi e Nesvan (Revolutionary Society of Women) in Shiraz in 1927, at the age of 18. The aims of the organization were the emancipation and unveiling of women. She published Dokhtran Iran (Daughters of Iran), a newspaper on women's issues from 1931 initially in Shiraz. After a few years, she moved to Tehran due to the unsuitable situations in Shiraz, and tried publishing Iranian Daughters' Publication. Her poems have radical feminist perspectives.

See also

Women's rights movement in Iran

Notes

References
Sanasarian, Eliz. The Women's Rights Movements in Iran, Praeger, New York: 1982, .

1909 births
1953 deaths
Iranian journalists
Iranian feminists
20th-century Iranian poets
Iranian women's rights activists
Persian-language women poets
Persian-language poets
Iranian educators
Iranian women writers
20th-century women writers
20th-century poets
20th-century Iranian educators
20th-century Iranian writers
20th-century journalists